Crawford Matthews (born 23 November 1991) is a former Scotland international rugby league footballer who has previously played for the Gateshead Thunder in League 1.

Background
Born in Norwich, Matthews attended Heaton Manor School, and started his rugby league career at the age of 14 with amateur club Gateshead Panthers. He later moved to Gateshead Thunder.

Club career

Hull FC
In September 2010, Matthews joined Super League side Hull F.C. Where he combined his rugby with under-graduate studies at the University of Hull. Although he played regularly for the under-20 side, he never made an appearance for the first team.

International career
Matthews has represented Scotland at under-16, under-18, 'A' team level, Students, 9s and made two appearances for the senior professional team against Ireland and France in 2011. He was also a member of the ashes winning Great Britain & Ireland Academic Lions squad in Australia 2011 - scoring a try in the final test.

References

1991 births
Living people
English people of Scottish descent
English rugby league players
Newcastle Thunder players
Rugby league fullbacks
Rugby league players from Norfolk
Scotland national rugby league team players